Angling Gading (born 8 May 1982), better known by his stage name Gading Marten, is an Indonesian actor and presenter. He is the elder brother of Gibran Marten, an Indonesian actor and singer.

Early life 
Gading Marten was born on 8 May 1982 in Jakarta, Indonesia, to Farida Sabtijastuti A. Kristijono (6 February 1954 – 1 October 2022) and Roy Marten (born 1 March 1952).

His mother Kristijono died at RS Polri Sukanto in Kramat Jati, East Jakarta, on 1 October 2022 at the age of 68.

Career 
Marten is a former footballer who played in Persitara North Jakarta. But he finally followed his father, Roy Marten, into the world of entertainment in 2004. He is well known by starring many teen soap operas, as well as a guest on several television shows and also as a presenter.

In the 2018 Indonesian Film Festival, Marten got his first Citra Award for Best Leading Actor for his role in the film Love for Sale. He then appeared in Crazy Awesome Teachers.

Personal life
Marten graduated from Atmajaya University Jakarta in March 2005 with a bachelor's degree in management. On 10 April 2012, he met Gisella Anastasia, a singer, in a venue of one TV station. They married on 14 September 2013 at Tirta Luhur Church, Uluwatu, Bali, and having a daughter, Gempita Nora Marten, born on 16 January 2015. Marten and Gisella divorced on 23 January 2019.

He is practicing Orthodox Christianity of the Eastern Orthodox Church with sacrament name Laurentios.

Filmography

Film

Soap operas 
 Kisah Sedih di Hari Minggu 
 Hingga Akhir Waktu
 Liontin 
 ABG 
 Luv 
 Si Cantik dan Si Buruk Rupa
 Aku Bukan Rio
 Manusia Bodoh
 Putri yang Terbuang
 Jelita 
 Safira 
 3 Semprul Mengejar Surga
 Malu Malu Mau

FTV 
 Beauty & The Lutung Kasarung (2012) as Tommy
 No Woman No Cry (2012) as himself
 I Love You But I Hate You (2012) as himself
 Gembel Gembel Gombal: 3G (2012) as himself
 Tiga Semprul Mengejar Surga sebagai Gading
 Gombal Gombal Gading (2012) as himself 
 Malu Malu Mau (2012) as himself
 Plis Jadikan Aku Kekasihmu (2012) as himself
 Ganteng Ganteng Gokil (2012) as himself
 Cinta di Kost-An Semprul (2013) as himself
 Bengkel Cinta Semprul (2013) as himself
 Ketemu Jodoh di Inbox (2013)
 Ada Cinta Di Rumah Susun (2015) as himself

TV Programs 
 Inbox SCTV
 Pesbukers Antv
 Odong Odong Global TV
 The Dance Icon Indonesia SCTV
 So Semprul SCTV
 Comedy Night Live NET.
 Stand Up Comedy Academy Indosiar
 Stand Up Comedy Club Indosiar
 Celebrity Squares NET.
 Live With Trio Lestari Trans TV

 Commercial 
 SAMSUNG Galaxy J1 (2015)

 Discography 

 Yang Tak Retak (2011)

 Song charts 

 Tak Ada Gading Yang Tak Retak Bertahan Merindu Tak Ingin Sendiri Biarlah (feat. Killing Me Inside)
 Merindu'' (versi asli)

References

External links 
 
 
 

1982 births
Living people
Indo people
Indonesian people of Dutch descent
Javanese people
Converts to Eastern Orthodoxy
Eastern Orthodox Christians from Indonesia
Indonesian male actors
People from Jakarta